Eszter Csizmadia (born 16 July 1978) is a Hungarian former judoka who competed in the 2000 Summer Olympics.

References

1978 births
Living people
Hungarian female judoka
Olympic judoka of Hungary
Judoka at the 2000 Summer Olympics
Martial artists from Budapest
Universiade medalists in judo
Universiade bronze medalists for Hungary
Medalists at the 1999 Summer Universiade